Yves-Marie Pasquet (born 1947 in Orléans) is a French composer of contemporary music, former teacher at the Sorbonne and in conservatories.

References

External links 
 
 List of works, WiseMusic Classical
 Biography and works, Centre de documentation de la musique contemporaine (Cdmc)
 About me by Yves-Marie Pasquet, website of Pierre Jean Jouve

1947 births
Living people
Musicians from Orléans
Conservatoire de Paris alumni
École Normale de Musique de Paris alumni
20th-century French composers
21st-century French composers
French male composers